Forever is an American comedy-drama streaming television series created by Alan Yang and Matt Hubbard that premiered on September 14, 2018 on Amazon Prime Video. It stars Fred Armisen and Maya Rudolph, both of whom also executive produced, alongside Yang, Hubbard, Dave Becky, and Tim Sarkes. On July 27, 2019, the series was cancelled after one season.

Premise
Forever follows married couple Oscar and June who live a comfortable but predictable life in suburban Riverside, California. For 12 years they’ve had the same conversations, eaten the same meals and taken pleasant vacations at the same lake house. After June talks Oscar into shaking things up with a ski trip, the pair find themselves in unfamiliar territory.

Cast and characters

Main
 Fred Armisen as Oscar Hoffman, a dentist and June's husband who dies after skiing into a tree. Content with living with an average and uneventful existence, he does not realize how restless his wife has become in their humdrum life.
 Maya Rudolph as June Hoffman, an employee of a timeshare company and Oscar's wife, who chokes to death on a macadamia nut about one year after Oscar's death. While in the afterlife, June realizes how unhappy she had been in her marriage and decides to seek something else.

Recurring
 Catherine Keener as Kase, a former government employee who moves to Riverside after being hit by a truck. Severely dissatisfied with her previous life, she sees the afterlife as a potential new start.
 Noah Robbins as Mark Erickson, a teenage boy who died in a car accident in the 1970s and lives in Riverside. He befriends Oscar and helps him navigate the afterlife.
 Sharon Omi as Mrs. Nakajima, an elderly woman who lives in Riverside and attempts to comfort Oscar after June leaves him.
 Kym Whitley as Sharon, a friend of June's who attempts to help her move on after Oscar's death.
 Charles Emmett as Jim, a man who lives in Riverside who is constantly seen mowing his lawn.
 Cooper Friedman as Josiah, a young boy who lives in Riverside and who apparently has been dead the longest and knows the most about the afterlife.
 Peter Weller as The Traveler, a mysterious man who leads others to Oceanside and prevents others from leaving.
 Julia Ormond as Marisol, a woman who lives in Oceanside.
 Obba Babatundé as Gregory, a man who lives in Oceanside.

Guest
 Amir M. Korangy as Dr. Mohammed ("Together Forever"), a fellow dentist who works with Oscar.
 Patricia Belcher as Ellen ("June"), an employee at the timeshare company who offers June the position she wants in Hawaii.
 Rheagan Wallace as Isabella ("June"), a clothing store employee who assists June in buying a new wardrobe for her move to Hawaii.
 Elizabeth Ho as Melanie Park ("The Lake House"), a woman who buys the lake house Oscar and June go to every year.
 Nancy Lenehan as Heather Jacoby ("Another Place"), a woman whom Mark knew in high school who died many years later. He endeavors to start a relationship with her until she reveals that she is waiting for the arrival of her husband of forty years.
 Hong Chau as Sarah ("Andre and Sarah"), a real estate agent, attempting to sell a house near Riverside, engaged in an ongoing affair.
 Jason Mitchell as Andre ("Andre and Sarah"), a real estate agent, attempting to sell a house near Riverside, engaged in an ongoing affair.
 Jesse D. Goins as 60 Year Old Andre ("Andre and Sarah"), an older Andre who goes back to the house that he and Sarah attempted to sell over the years to see her again. He is distraught when informed that she has recently died.

Episodes

Production

Development
On September 8, 2017, it was announced that Amazon had given the production a straight-to-series order consisting of one season. The series was created by Alan Yang and Matt Hubbard who are set to executive produce the series alongside Fred Armisen, Maya Rudolph, Dave Becky, and Tim Sarkes. Production companies expected to be involved with the series included Universal Television. On December 21, 2017, it was reported that the series was expected to debut in 2018. On August 2, 2018, it was announced that the series would premiere on September 14, 2018.

Casting
Alongside the initial series announcement, it was reported that Armisen and Rudolph were cast in the series' lead roles. On December 1, 2017, it was announced that Catherine Keener had joined the series in a recurring role.

Release
On August 2, 2018, the first trailer and poster for the series were released.

Reception

Critical response
The series has been met with a positive response from critics upon its premiere. On the review aggregation website Rotten Tomatoes, the first season holds a 94% approval rating, with an average rating of 7.65 out of 10 based on 36 reviews. The website's critical consensus reads, "Forever is a gently harrowing and mirthful dive into the ennui of matrimony, elevated by Maya Rudolph's dazzling turn of not-so-quiet desperation." Metacritic, which uses a weighted average, assigned the season a score of 77 out of 100 based on 20 critics, indicating "generally favorable reviews."

Awards and nominations

References

External links
 
 

2010s American comedy-drama television series
2018 American television series debuts
2018 American television series endings
English-language television shows
Amazon Prime Video original programming
Television series by 3 Arts Entertainment
Television series by Universal Television
Television series by Amazon Studios
Television shows about death
Fiction about the afterlife
Television shows set in California